The Dickinson County Healthcare System is a hospital located in Iron Mountain, Michigan.

Images

References

External links
Official website

Hospitals in Michigan